South Province or Southern Province may refer to:

South Province, Cameroon
South Province, Maldives
South Province, New Caledonia
South Province (Western Australia), a former electoral province of Western Australia
Southern Province, Afghanistan
Southern Province (Canadian Shield), a physiographic unit in North America
Southern Province (IMCRA region), a marine biogeographic region of Australia
Southern Province, Rwanda
Southern Province, Sierra Leone
Southern Province, Sri Lanka
Southern Province (Victoria), a former electoral province of Victoria, Australia
Southern Province, Zambia
Southern Provinces, a term used by Morocco for Western Sahara
Province of Canterbury, an ecclesiastical province of the Church of England

Province name disambiguation pages